Otto Garnus (1896 – 1 February 1960) was a Swiss athlete. He competed in the men's shot put and the men's discus throw at the 1924 Summer Olympics. He also competed in the men's 82.5kg division in the weightlifting at the 1928 Summer Olympics.

References

External links
 

1896 births
1960 deaths
Athletes (track and field) at the 1924 Summer Olympics
Weightlifters at the 1928 Summer Olympics
Swiss male shot putters
Swiss male discus throwers
Swiss male weightlifters
Olympic athletes of Switzerland
Olympic weightlifters of Switzerland
Place of birth missing